Brandon Carswell (born May 22, 1989) is a former American football wide receiver. He played college football for the USC Trojans. Carswell signed as an undrafted free agent after the 2012 NFL Draft.

High school
Carswell attended Milpitas High School in Milpitas, CA. Carswell chose to attend USC after being recruited by many other top schools.

College career
Carswell played the most during his redshirt senior year, after considering transferring due to sanctions.

Professional career

Oakland Raiders
Carswell was signed by the Oakland Raiders as an undrafted free agent after the 2012 NFL Draft. He was released on September 12, 2012.

San Francisco 49ers
In 2013, he signed with the 49ers but was placed on injured reserve. He was waived on April 11, 2014.

References

External links
San Francisco 49ers bio
USC Trojans bio

1989 births
Living people
People from Milpitas, California
Players of American football from California
American football wide receivers
USC Trojans football players
San Francisco 49ers players
Sportspeople from Santa Clara County, California